The Killing Jar (Chatto and Windus) is the debut novel of Nicola Monaghan, published in March 2006. It tells the story of Kerrie Ann Hill, a young girl growing up on a drug-ridden housing estate in Nottingham. Kerrie Ann meets an elderly neighbour when she's young, Mrs Ivanovich, an entomologist who teaches Kerrie about life, death, the Amazon rainforest and the miniature, alien world of insects. "Kez" struggles to look after her brother Jon, and hold things together as she's brought up by her junkie mum, Sue, and later, living with her boyfriend Mark as he becomes more and more involved with heroin and crack cocaine.

The book explores themes of metamorphosis, the highs and lows of drugs, and how people become trapped by poisoned environments, and what it takes to escape them.

Monaghan was included in The Independent'''s New Year list of "Rising Talent of 2006" and The Killing Jar'' made their 50 Hot Books for summer and Books of Year features.  It went on to win a Betty Trask Award The Authors' Club Best First Novel Award, and the Waverton Good Read Award.

Footnotes

External links
US Trade Reviews
New Zealand Listener
The Written Nerd
East London and West Essex Guardian
The Observer
Mslexia
The Independent
A page of links to further reviews
 The Killing Jar website
 The Betty Trask Awards
 Independent: Rising Stars of 2006
 The Waverton Good Read

2006 novels
Novels set in Nottinghamshire
Chatto & Windus books
2006 debut novels